Neftebaza is a rural locality (a selo) in Ongudaysky District, the Altai Republic, Russia. The population was 62 as of 2016. There is 1 street.

Geography 
Neftebaza is located 26 km northwest of Onguday (the district's administrative centre) by road. Tuyekta and Talda are the nearest rural localities.

References 

Rural localities in Ongudaysky District